Encanto Park is a public park in central Phoenix, Arizona.

One notable attraction at Encanto Park is Enchanted Island, an amusement park with rides, games, concessions, and a miniature train ride around the amusement area.

Encanto Park has been designated as a Phoenix Point of Pride.

History
The Encanto area become a City of Phoenix park in 1934.  Property was purchased from J. W. Doris (100 acres) and Dr. Norton among others. Quitclaim deed 11-27-1934. It was re-classified as a park to curtail livestock grazing. By 1955, the Encanto Park Brochure included activities such as archery, tennis, badminton and other games. In the mid-1970s, the Phoenix Parks and Recreation Department encouraged archery events. In 1985, more sports facilities to accommodate greater interest in physical fitness and games. The focus was on soccer and handball, leaving archery to one side.  Bike paths and jogging trails are also a major focus. The improvements were made to the “south side” by way of 1979 and 1984 bonds totaling $1.3M

See also

 List of historic properties in Phoenix, Arizona

References

External links
 
 Friends of Encanto Park
 Arizona Fishing Locations Map
 Where to Fish in Arizona Species Information
 Arizona Boating Locations Facilities Map
 Arizona Lake Levels
 North Encanto Neighborhood Association

Parks in Phoenix, Arizona
Reservoirs in Maricopa County, Arizona
Phoenix Points of Pride
Reservoirs in Arizona